The following is a list of Egyptian Nobel laureates and nominees:

Laureates

Nominees
The following list are the nominees with verified nominations from the Nobel Committee and recognized international organizations. There are also other purported nominees whose nominations are yet to be verified since the archives are revealed 50 years after, among them Nawal El Saadawi [نوال السعداوي] (for Literature), Sonallah Ibrahim [ صنع الله إبراهيم] (for Literature), Alaa Al Aswany [علاء الأسواني] (for Literature), Ahdaf Soueif [ميرال الطحاوي] (for Literature), Yusuf Idris [يوسف إدريس] (for Literature), Miral al-Tahawy [ميرال الطحاوي] (for Literature), Gamal al-Ghitani [جمال الغيطانى] (for Literature), Maikel Nabil Sanad [مايكل نبيل سند] (for Peace), Wael Ghonim [وائل غنيم] (for Peace), Israa Abdel Fattah [إسراء عبد الفتاح] (for Peace), Sœur Emmanuelle Cinquin N.D.S. (for Peace), and Abdel Fattah el-Sisi [عبد الفتاح السیسی] (for Peace).

Notes

References

Lists of Nobel laureates by nationality
Lists of Egyptian people